David MacGregor (born 9 June 1981) is a Scottish former footballer who is currently U20s assistant manager at Stranraer.

MacGregor started his career with home town club Greenock Morton at the age of 14, before moving to Stranraer in 2011, and finishing his career with Queen's Park.

Playing career

Morton
Born in Greenock, MacGregor progressed through Greenock Morton's youth ranks to become a dependable first team player. He was a product of the Peter Weir youth side; a side that ran Celtic so close in the Scottish Youth Cup semi-final at Parkhead in 1999. David's progress was rapid and as a result he made his first team debut in season 1999/00 at 18 years old. It could be argued that his progress was somewhat accelerated by Morton's mismanagement by then owner and chairman Hugh Scott.

MacGregor started out as a midfielder but also proved his versatility when he easily adapted to play at right back. However his career took a significant turn for the worse in 2001. Towards the end of the 2000/01 season Hugh Scott put Morton into administration. As a result of ongoing cash flow problems administrator Graham Martin was forced to release all of Morton's first team players. Unfortunately MacGregor was one of them. After chairman Douglas Rae stepped in to save the club from folding the team advertised for players to come for trials. MacGregor appeared at these trials and subsequently re-signed for the club.

2001–02 was his first season back at Cappielow. However this ended in relegation from the Scottish Second Division. The next season was much better as Morton won the Scottish Third Division Championship. The joy of a winners medal was not as sweet as it should have been for MacGregor. The reason being that in the 5th from last game of the season he suffered a broken leg and was ruled out of the game for a year. MacGregor was Morton's longest serving player having played for the club for 11 years. During that period his dedication was rewarded by chairman Douglas Rae when he gave David a three-year contract extension (when he was out injured) in 2003. He established himself as a defender in the squad. He is first and foremost a centre-back but he, more often than not, played at left back for Jim McInally, even though he is predominantly right footed.

At the end of the 2007–08 season, MacGregor required a hernia operation after the away game in April against St Johnstone. He was out after this operation he was out for approximately six months before making his return to the first team against Clyde in Morton's first win of the season on 18 October 2008. When MacGregor came back into the side in October 2008, he was played in the right back berth, which earlier in the season was filled by Alex Walker.

Despite being injured for most of the 2008–09 season, MacGregor was given a contract extension by Davie Irons until August 2009 to prove his fitness ahead of the next season. After receiving the extension, which was until 15 August 2009, MacGregor managed to regain the ability to run in June 2009 ahead of the season to give him hope of gaining a contract extension for the rest of the season. On 17 August, MacGregor signed a new one-year deal to take him until the end of 2009–10 season.

As with the end of the previous season, at the end of the 2009–10 season MacGregor was again injured. He was offered the summer to prove his fitness, to see if he merited a contract extension under new manager Allan Moore. Once again he received a further year on 19 July 2010.

Stranraer
MacGregor was released by Morton in May 2011, and signed with Stranraer after playing in a couple of trial matches. After playing in seven league matches, MacGregor was signed until the end of the season. In June 2012, MacGregor signed another extension for a further season at Stair Park.

Queen's Park
On 27 June 2014, MacGregor signed for Scottish League Two club Queen's Park. On 28 July 2015, he left Queen's Park, the club agreeing to release him due to work commitments.

Coaching career
In May 2017, MacGregor was appointed assistant to U20s manager Stuart Wild at Stranraer

Honours

Greenock Morton
Scottish Football League Second Division: 2006–07
Scottish Football League Third Division: 2002–03

References

External links
  (not very accurate, missing many games)
  (misspelt, with some Morton and Stranraer games)

1981 births
Living people
Greenock Morton F.C. players
Scottish footballers
Association football fullbacks
Stranraer F.C. players
Queen's Park F.C. players
Footballers from Greenock
Scottish Football League players
Scottish Professional Football League players
Greenock Morton F.C. non-playing staff